Jorge Enrique González Torres Airport  is an airport serving San José del Guaviare, the capital of the Guaviare Department of Colombia. The runway is just north of the town and parallels the Guaviare River.

Runway 01 has an additional  of grass overrun on the north end. The San Jose Del Guaviare non-directional beacon (Ident: SJE) is located on the field.

Airlines and destinations

Accidents and incidents
On 9 March 2019, Douglas DC-3 HK-2494 of LASER Aéro Colombia crashed en route to La Vanguardia Airport, in Villavicencio, killing all 14 occupants.

See also
Transport in Colombia
List of airports in Colombia

References

External links
OpenStreetMap - San José
OurAirports - San José
FallingRain - San José Airport

Airports in Colombia
Buildings and structures in Guaviare Department